The Lisbon Exempted Village School District is a public school district serving the Lisbon area in central Columbiana County in the U.S. state of Ohio.

David Anderson Junior/Senior High School is the only high school in the district.  The schools' sports teams are nicknamed the "Blue Devils". The district's colors are blue and white.

Schools currently in operation by the school district

References

External links

Education in Columbiana County, Ohio
School districts in Ohio
Public schools in Ohio